Indirect parliamentary elections were held in Guinea-Bissau between 19 December 1976 and mid-January 1977 (voting had been due to end on 29 December, but was extended), the first since independence from Portugal. At the time, the country was a one-party state with the African Party for the Independence of Guinea and Cape Verde (PAIGC) as the sole legal party. A single, official list of PAIGC candidates was presented to voters, although in some areas people voted for unofficial candidates, who achieved almost 20% of the national vote. The Assembly elected Luís Cabral to the post of President on 13 March 1977.

Electoral system
The indirect election saw voters elect members of eight regional councils, who in turn elected the 150 members of the National People's Assembly. At least 50% of registered voters had to cast ballot in an electoral district for the election to be valid. Anyone over the age of 15 and with Guinea-Bissau citizenship was entitled to vote, unless they had been disqualified.

Results

References

Guinea-Bissau
Guinea-Bissau
Legislative election
Legislative election
Elections in Guinea-Bissau
One-party elections
Election and referendum articles with incomplete results
Guinea-Bissau legislative election
Guinea-Bissau legislative election